Meenagolan is a townland in Southwest of County Donegal, Ireland in the civil and church parish of Killaghtee.  The main geographical feature is Croagh Lough.  The lough is currently used as a reservoir for the nearby town of Ardara.  Large tracts of the townland are now owned by Coilte, the Irish forestry state body, and planted with fir.

External links
 Meenagolan Townland, Co. Donegal at townlands.ie

Townlands of County Donegal